The Beijing Planetarium is a planetarium in Xicheng District, Beijing, China.

The planetarium comprises two main buildings, Building A & B. Building A, which was built in 1957, contains the Celestial Theater, an Eastern Exhibition Hall and a Western Exhibition Hall. It was the first large-scale planetarium in China, and at one time the only planetarium in Asia. Building B, which began operations in 2004, contains a digital space theater, 3D and 4D theaters, several exhibition halls and two observatories.

See also
 List of planetariums

References

External links

Official website 
Official website 

Museums in Beijing
Science museums in China
Planetaria in China
National first-grade museums of China
Xicheng District